The 2013–14 Welsh Alliance League, known as the Lock Stock Welsh Alliance League for sponsorship reasons, is the 30th season of the Welsh Alliance League, which consists of two divisions: the third and fourth levels of the Welsh football pyramid.

There are fifteen teams in Division 1 and thirteen teams in Division 2, with the champions of Division 1 promoted to the Cymru Alliance. In Division 2, the champions, and runners-up are promoted to Division 1.

The season began on 10 August 2013 and concluded on 17 May 2014 with Denbigh Town as Division 1 champions. In Division 2, Penrhyndeudraeth were champions with Kinmel Bay Sports as runners-up.

Division 1

Teams 
Caernarfon Town were champions in the previous season and were promoted to the Cymru Alliance. They were replaced by Division 2 champions, Llandyrnog United and runners-up, Llanfairpwll, who were promoted to Division 1.

Grounds and locations

League table

Results

Division 2

Teams 
Llandyrnog United were champions in the previous season and were promoted to Division 1 along with runners-up, Llanfairpwll. They were replaced by Gwynedd League champions, Trearddur Bay and Vale of Clwyd and Conwy Football League champions, St Asaph City who were promoted to Division 2. In addition Bethesda Athletic rejoined the Welsh Alliance League.

Grounds and locations

League table

Results

References

Welsh Alliance League seasons
3
Wales